is a Japanese actress and popular celebrity. She is represented by Asai Kikaku.

Early life and education 
Okamoto moved to Tokyo at one year old, and graduated from Kichiyoshi Girls High School English Course and later Dokkyo University Law school.

Major appearing programmes

Current regular programmes
 Television

 Radio

Former regular programmes
 Television

 Radio

Other appearances

Films

TV dramas

Stage

Advertisements

Works

Photo albums

CD

DVD

Personal life 
Okamoto married former footballer Hiroshige Yanagimoto, who was affiliated with Cerezo Osaka at the time, in July 2005, but divorced in July 2017.

References

External links
 
 – Ameba Blog 
 – GREE 
 

Japanese television personalities
Japanese actresses
People from Nagoya
People from Tokyo
1973 births
Living people
Dokkyo University alumni